Bollimunta (Telugu: బొల్లిముంత) is one of the Indian surnames.

 Bollimunta Sivaramakrishna (1920–2005), Indian writer

Indian surnames